The Polish Blitz Chess Championship is a chess competition held annually in Poland.

Medal winners Men

Medal winners Women

References

Chess national championships
Women's chess national championships
Chess in Poland
Recurring events established in 1966